The Scottish PGA Championship is a golf tournament played annually in Scotland since 1907. For many years the event was called the Scottish Professional Championship. It is the flagship event on the "Tartan Tour", the PGA Tour in Scotland's schedule. The 2016 event was the 100th staging of the Championship and the final event on the 2016 Tartan Tour schedule.

History

1907 Scottish Professional Championship
The 1907 Championship was held on 25 and 26 October at Panmure Golf Club, two miles west of Carnoustie. The championship was over 72 holes of medal play with 36 holes played each day. Entry was restricted to professionals born and resident in Scotland. The professionals also had to be either a member of the PGA or attached to a club. The residency rule excluded players like James Braid and Sandy Herd who were attached to English clubs. There were 44 entries. Prize money amounted to £70 of which £20 was provided by the Panmure Club. Prizes were given to the leading 6 players, the winner also receiving a gold medal. The scorer of the lowest round of the championship received £5.

John Hunter and Robert Thomson led after the first day on 150 with 52-year-old Willie Fernie, the 1883 Open Champion next on 152. On the second morning Hunter went round in 71, beating the course record by 2 shots, and giving him a six stroke lead. Hunter struggled in the final round taking 83. He took 7 at the 7th hole, where he had taken 2 in the morning, incurring a two-stroke penalty for grounding his club in a bunker. Thomson also took 83 for his last round but David Kinnell  and Willie Fernie had chances to catch Hunter's total of 304. Kinnell finished a shot behind and was joined by Fernie after he took 5 at the last, needing a 4 to tie with Hunter. Prizes were distributed by the Countess of Dalhousie. Hunter received £30, the gold medal and the £5 for the lowest round. Fernie and Kinnell shared £25 for second place.

Winners

In 1908 Thomson beat Watt 146 to 153 in the 36-hole playoff. In 1970 Shade and Webster scored 70 in the 18-hole playoff with Huish scoring 73. Shade won at the next hole in a sudden-death playoff. In 1971 Gallacher beat Brown 68 to 73 in the 18-hole playoff. In 1975 Huish beat Wood at the second extra hole. In 1979 Lyle beat Torrance at the third extra hole. In 1982 Barnes beat Thomson at the second extra hole. In 1983 Gallacher beat Drummond at the second extra hole. In 1994 Coltart beat Orr at the second extra hole. In 1999 the Championship was awarded to the leading Scot in the European Tour Scottish PGA Championship. In 2001 Chillas beat Urquhart at the second extra hole. In 2004 Ronald beat Kelly at the second extra hole with a birdie. In 2006 Robertson beat Lee at the second extra hole with a birdie. In 2010 Doak beat Wright at the fourth extra hole. In 2015 Kelly beat McKechnie at the first extra hole with an eagle 3. In 2016 Wright beat O'Hara at the first extra hole with an eagle 3. In 2019 O'Hara beat Forsyth with a par at the second extra hole.

+ reduced to 54 holes. In 1913 fog meant that the morning round on the second day could not be played.
++ reduced to 36 holes. Brown and Panton declared joint winners after persistent haar made play impossible.
+++ reduced to 36 holes. No play was possible on the first day because of course flooding.

References

External links
Scottish PGA Championship official site

Golf tournaments in Scotland
Recurring sporting events established in 1907
1907 establishments in Scotland
Annual sporting events in the United Kingdom